Soulville may refer to:

Soulville (Ben Webster album), 1957
Soulville (Rick Price album), 2021

See also
Soulsville (disambiguation)